Patrick N'Koyi-Kiabu (born 1 January 1990) is a Congolese-Dutch professional footballer who plays as a forward for KSK Hasselt.

He formerly played for FC Eindhoven, Fortuna Sittard, Petrolul Ploiești, Rapid București, and MVV Maastricht, Sukhothai and Dundee United.

Early and personal life
Born in Kinshasa, DR Congo, N'Koyi moved to the Netherlands with his family at the age of 4.

Career
N'Koyi has played club football in the Netherlands for FC Eindhoven and Fortuna Sittard. In January 2014, he and his teammate Gevaro Nepomuceno had signed pre-contracts with Liga I club Petrolul Ploiești, as they entered their last six months of their spells at Fortuna. They joined Petrolul at the start of the 2014–15 season. He then moved to Rapid București in August 2015, leaving the club at the end of the 2015–16 season. He returned to the Netherlands with MVV Maastricht in July 2016, before signing for Thai club Sukhothai in June 2017. However, shortly after joining the club, N'Koyi moved on, subsequently signing with Scottish Championship side Dundee United on 30 June 2017.

N'Koyi's time with United was short lived, with the striker leaving the club in December 2017. He made 14 appearances in all competitions, with the majority coming as a substitute. He managed to score 3 goals during his time at United, all of which came in the Scottish Challenge Cup.

After a spell with TOP Oss, he signed for Icelandic club Grindavík in January 2019. In the summer 2019, he moved to Belgian club KSK Hasselt.

Career statistics

References

External links
 
 

1990 births
Living people
Footballers from Kinshasa
Democratic Republic of the Congo footballers
Dutch footballers
Footballers from North Brabant
Democratic Republic of the Congo emigrants to the Netherlands
People with acquired Dutch citizenship
FC Eindhoven players
Fortuna Sittard players
FC Petrolul Ploiești players
FC Rapid București players
MVV Maastricht players
Patrick N'Koyi
Dundee United F.C. players
TOP Oss players
Grindavík men's football players
Eerste Divisie players
Scottish Professional Football League players
Association football forwards
Democratic Republic of the Congo expatriate footballers
Dutch expatriate footballers
Expatriate footballers in Romania
Democratic Republic of the Congo expatriate sportspeople in Romania
Dutch expatriate sportspeople in Romania
Expatriate footballers in Scotland
Democratic Republic of the Congo expatriate sportspeople in Scotland
Dutch expatriate sportspeople in Scotland
Democratic Republic of the Congo expatriate sportspeople in Iceland
Dutch expatriate sportspeople in Iceland
Expatriate footballers in Iceland
Democratic Republic of the Congo expatriate sportspeople in Thailand
Dutch expatriate sportspeople in Thailand
Expatriate footballers in Thailand